The FC Basel 1927–28 season was their thirty fifth season since the club's foundation on 15 November 1893. The club's new chairman was Karl Junker took over the presidency from Carl Burkhardt at the AGM on 8 July 1927. However Junker only remained as president until 15 September, then Karl Ibach took over for his third period. FC Basel played their home games in the Landhof in the district Wettstein in Kleinbasel.

Overview 
Karl Bielser was team captain for the third season in a row and as captain he led the team trainings and was responsible for the line-ups. During the season Peter Riesterer took over as team captain and he acted as team coach from then onwards. Basel played a total of 27 matches in their 1927–28 season. 16 of these were in the domestic league, one was in the Swiss Cup and 10 were friendly matches. Of these 10 friendlies four were played at home in the Landhof and six were away games. Apart from the away game against Mulhouse all other matches were in Switzerland. The team won four of the friendly games and lost the other six. They scored 20 goals and conceded 26.

Probably one of the biggest highlights during these friendly games, was the fixture in the Landhof against Everton, who had just won the English Football League championship that season. The game attracted 8,000 supporters, but Basel lost the comparison against the English champions by two goals to nil. Both goals were scored by Dixie Dean. Dean's greatest point of note is that he is still the only player in English football to score 60 league goals in one season and this (1927–28) was the season in that he accomplished this record. At that the end of that season he was 21 years old.

The 1927–28 Swiss Serie A was divided into three regional groups, each group with nine teams. Basel were allocated to the Central group together with the other three local clubs Concordia Basel, Nordstern Basel and Old Boys Basel. The other five teams allocated to this group were Young Boys Bern, FC Bern, Aarau, Grenchen and Solothurn. The teams that won each group continue to the finals and the last placed teams in the groups had to play a barrage against relegation.  FC Basel played a good season, won ten matches, one was drawn and they suffered five defeats. Basel scored 27 goals and conceded 21. With 21 points they ended the season in third position, two points behind group winners and local rivals Nordstern. Nordstern advanced to the finals. Grasshopper Club won the championship, Nordstern were runner-up and Étoile Carouge were third. Solothurn finished the season in last position and competed the promotion/relegation play-off against Luzern. Winning the first match and drawing the second leg they retained their place in the top tier of Swiss football.

In this season's Swiss Cup Basel were drawn against Young Fellows Zürich in the first round and were eliminated because they lost 0–1. Servette won the cup, beating Grasshopper Club 5–1 in the final.

Players 
Squad members

Players who left the squad

Results 
Legend

Friendly matches

Pre- and mid-season

Winter break

Serie A

Central Group results

Central Group table

Swiss Cup

See also 
 History of FC Basel
 List of FC Basel players
 List of FC Basel seasons

References

Sources 
 Rotblau: Jahrbuch Saison 2014/2015. Publisher: FC Basel Marketing AG. 
 Die ersten 125 Jahre. Publisher: Josef Zindel im Friedrich Reinhardt Verlag, Basel. 
 FCB team 1927–28 at fcb-archiv.ch
 Switzerland 1927-28 at RSSSF

External links
 FC Basel official site

FC Basel seasons
Basel